Back to Mine: Groove Armada is a compilation album from the Back to Mine series from Ultra Records. The mixtape was released in 2000. It was compiled by British electronica band Groove Armada.

Track listing

Certifications

References

Groove Armada
Groove Armada albums
2000 compilation albums